Dudley Digges may refer to:

 Dudley Digges (1583–1639), English diplomat and politician
 Dudley Digges (writer) (1613–1643), English Royalist political writer; son of the above
 Dudley Digges (actor) (1879–1947), Irish stage and film actor